ICLP can stand for:

The International Chinese Language Program, an institute for Chinese language instruction located in Taiwan.
The International Conference on Logic Programming.